CRS Hall Zielona Góra, officially Centrum Rekreacyjno-Sportowe w Zielonej Górze in Polish, is a multi-use indoor sporting arena that is located in Zielona Góra, Poland.

The arena can be used for basketball, handball, futsal, volleyball, and cultural and entertainment events. The seating capacity of the arena for basketball games is 6,080, of which 5,080 seats are permanent and 1,000 seats are retractable. It is the home arena of the Polish League professional basketball club Zastal Zielona Góra.

References

External links
Basket Zielona Góra Arena Site 
CRS Hall Zielona Góra Arena Interior Picture

Indoor arenas in Poland
Basketball venues in Poland
Sports venues completed in 2010
Buildings and structures in Zielona Góra
Sports venues in Lubusz Voivodeship